Katherine Elizabeth Vernon (born April 21, 1961) is a Canadian-born American actress. She is known for her roles as Lorraine Prescott on the CBS primetime soap opera Falcon Crest (from 1984–1985), the stuck-up and popular Benny Hanson in the comedy film Pretty in Pink (1986), Sophia in the 1992 Spike Lee film, Malcolm X, and Ellen Tigh in the 2004 Syfy series Battlestar Galactica.

Early life
Vernon was born in Toronto, Ontario, Canada to Nancy West and actor John Vernon. At age seven, she moved with her family to Los Angeles, California, where her father was pursuing his career. Her sister is singer Nan Vernon.

Career
Vernon portrayed Lorraine Prescott on the CBS prime time soap opera Falcon Crest from 1984 to 1985. During the 1980s she appeared on various TV series, including Family Ties, Dallas, Remington Steele, Hotel, Murder, She Wrote and the 1987 miniseries I'll Take Manhattan, as well as the 1986 comedy-drama film Pretty in Pink, and the 1989 gangster comedy Mob Story, in which she appeared opposite her father. Other early film credits included Alphabet City (1984) and Roadhouse 66 (1985).

In 1990 Vernon portrayed Kathleen Sawyer in a four-episode arc on Who's the Boss?, followed by extended appearances on L.A. Law in 1994 as A.D.A. Belinda Fox (four episodes) and on Nash Bridges in 1996–1997 as Whitney Thomas (seven episodes). Among many other roles, she co-starred as Sophia in the 1992 film Malcolm X, appeared in the 1992 Italian sci-fi film Jackpot, portrayed Alexandra on the 1996 series Kindred: The Embraced and appeared in a 1998 episode of Star Trek: Voyager entitled "In the Flesh". She played Dr. Rachel Stein in the 1998 TV movie Blackjack.

From 2004 to 2009, Vernon portrayed the recurring role of Ellen Tigh on Battlestar Galactica. In April 2009, she made a guest appearance on CSI: Crime Scene Investigation entitled "A Space Oddity",  which also featured cameos by her former Galactica producer Ronald D. Moore and co-stars Grace Park and Rekha Sharma. In 2010 she guest starred in two episodes of Heroes ("Close to You" and "Pass/Fail") as Vanessa Wheeler, and in 2014 portrayed Diana Sydney on The 100 and Starfleet captain Sonya Alexander in the fan film Star Trek: Prelude To Axanar. In 2016, Vernon played Caroline Morrow in an episode of NCIS. She appeared in several episodes of the Apple TV+ series The Morning Show in 2019.

Filmography

References

External links 
 . Archived from the original on July 24, 2017.
 
 
 
 

1961 births
Living people
Canadian television actresses
Canadian film actresses
American film actresses
American television actresses
20th-century Canadian actresses
20th-century American actresses
21st-century Canadian actresses
21st-century American actresses
Canadian soap opera actresses
American soap opera actresses